Protosirenidae is an extinct primitive family of the order Sirenia.

Protosirenids are thought to have been amphibious quadrupeds, meaning that they spent their time both on land and in the water and had four legs.

See also

Dugongidae
Evolution of sirenians
Manatee

References

External links
 Protosiren at The Paleobiology Database.

Eocene sirenians
Prehistoric mammal families